Torsten Eckbrett (born April 13, 1984 in Potsdam) is a German sprint canoer who has competed since the late 2000s. He won a bronze medal in the K-4 1000 m event at the 2008 Summer Olympics in Beijing.

References
Beijing2008 profile
Sports-reference.com profile

1984 births
Canoeists at the 2008 Summer Olympics
German male canoeists
Living people
Olympic canoeists of Germany
Olympic bronze medalists for Germany
Olympic medalists in canoeing
Medalists at the 2008 Summer Olympics
Sportspeople from Potsdam